The 1965–66 Ashes series consisted of five cricket Test matches, each of five days with six hours play and eight ball overs. It formed part of the MCC tour of Australia in 1965–66 and the matches outside the Tests were played in the name of the Marylebone Cricket Club. M.J.K. Smith led the England team with the intent on
regaining the Ashes lost in the 1958–59 Ashes series, but the series was drawn 1-1 and they were retained by Australia. The Australian team was captained by Bobby Simpson in three Tests, and his vice-captain Brian Booth in two Tests.

It was the first tour of Australia by players instead of amateurs and professionals and the first time that the MCC travelled to Australia by air instead of by sea. Although the press labelled the England team as the weakest to go to Australia, their entertaining cricket won them favour with the crowds. They also made their runs faster than any other England team since the war and for once England batted faster than Australia, a refreshing contrast to other Ashes series of the era.

With both sides having good batsmen and weak bowling attacks an exceptional number of runs were made, especially by Australia in the last two Tests when they fielded seven specialist batsmen and an all rounder. A record eleven batsmen averaged over 40 in the series and the teams exceeded 500 in an innings three times between them, 400 another four times and England made their highest score in Australia since 1928–29. "The long and short of it was that the batting of both sides was much stronger than the bowling".

In the Third Test at Sydney England's Bob Barber and Geoff Boycott added 234 for the first wicket in 242 minutes, the highest opening partnership by England in Australia since Jack Hobbs and Herbert Sutcliffe made 283 at Melbourne in 1924–25, resulting in Australia's defeat by an innings and 93 runs, their worst result at home since 1911–12. In the Fourth Test at Adelaide Bobby Simpson and Bill Lawry added 244 in 255 minutes, the highest opening stand by Australia in an Ashes Test at the time, and still their highest opening stand against England in Australia. They won by an innings and 9 runs to even the series, only the third time that two teams had defeated each other by an innings in successive Tests.

Lawry "always seemed to be batting", his 592 runs (84.57) were the most in an Ashes series since Don Bradman in 1946–47 and his three centuries the most since Arthur Morris in 1948. Bob Cowper retained the Ashes for Australia with his 307 in 727 minutes in the Fifth Test at Melbourne, the first Test triple century in Australia, the longest Test innings in Australia and the highest Ashes century in Australia. The series also saw the debut of the Australians Doug Walters, who made a century on debut, Keith Stackpole and Peter Allan and the final Tests of Wally Grout, Brian Booth, Peter Burge and David Sincock.

First Test – Brisbane

Australia had substantially the better of it, Walters adding his name to the fairly select list of those who have made a hundred in their first Test...After Walters's innings I wrote that with one necessary qualification I thought he would be come to be rated as the best bat produced by Australia since Neil Harvey proclaimed himself with his famous hundred at Headingley in 48. The reservation concerned his ability against really fast bowling, as to which I had no evidence...Only Lawry and Simpson have made more runs and had record to compare if one is to make a quantitative judgement. Any all events my contention is at least arguable. Doug has made eleven hundreds for Australia , some of extreme brilliance, and if he ever played a dull innings I never saw it.
E.W. Swanton

Preliminaries
Although the wicket at the Gabba usually favours fast bowlers both teams used a leg spinner and two off-spinners in the match, Bob Barber, Fred Titmus and Dave Allen for England and Peter Philpott, Tom Veivers and Bob Cowper for Australia. Vice-captain Brian Booth took command as Bobby Simpson had broken his wrist, and elected to bat after winning the toss. The 19-year-old Doug Walters was called up for his Test debut after having made 129 for New South Wales against the tourists and so was the fast bowler Peter Allan on his home ground. Bill Lawry's Victorian teammate Ian Redpath was brought in to open instead of Simpson. The veteran batsman Peter Burge ensured his place with innings of 52, 50, 114 not out and 60 against the MCC. The tourists had had the best run of games of any MCC team since the war, beating Western Australia, South Australia and New South Wales, drawing with Queensland, when they needed two more wickets to win, and losing to Victoria by 32 runs after a run-chase. As a result, the bookies reduced the odds of their winning the Ashes from 7/2 to evens. The England vice-captain Colin Cowdrey was unable to play and was replaced by the in form Scottish opener Eric Russell.

Australia – First Innings
Persistent rain ruined the first two days with less than three hours play on the first day and none on the second. England thought their wicket-keeper Jim Parks caught Bill Lawry off Dave Brown (3/71) with his seventh ball, but were turned down by Umpire Egar. This was the first and last umpiring dispute of the series as Egar and Lou Rowan soon established their credentials. Lawry – "England's scourge of the sixties" – stayed put until the afternoon of the third day making 166. He added 187 with Doug Walters who hit 155 with 11 fours and 2 sixes to become the 10th Australian to make a century on his Ashes debut, and aged 19 years and 357 days the third youngest after Archie Jackson and Neil Harvey. The off-spinner Tom Veivers made 56 not out and Booth declared on 443/6 early on the fourth day, leaving him 11 hours to bowl England out twice if he could enforce the follow on.

England – First Innings
England made steady progress, Bob Barber was out for 5, but the young batsmen Geoff Boycott (45) and John Edrich (32) batted for 108 minutes adding 70 runs for the second wicket before the leg-spinner Peter Philpott removed them both. The stonewaller Ken Barrington dug himself in for over three hours making 53 while first Jim Parks (52) and Fred Titmus (60) attacked the bowling at the other end. Parks hit 4 fours and 3 sixes and Titmus 6 fours and Barrington asked them to slow down as they were making him look foolish. They both fell to Philpott, as did Brown to give the Australian 5/90, his only five-wicket haul in Tests. The last five wickets fell for 59 runs and Eric Russell, who had injured his hand, came in last and batted out an unbeaten duck in his only Test of the series. Though England made 280 – 183 runs behind – Booth could enforce the follow on due to the truncated play on the first two days.

England – Second Innings
Australia had less than three and a half hours to bowl England out for victory and their spinners gave them 50 overs to do so. Bob Barber hit 34 off 37 balls with 3 fours and a six, but Geoff Boycott carried his bat through to stumps with 63 not out. Boycott pushed a ball from Peter Philpott away with his hand during his innings, but Brian Booth refused to appeal for handled the ball and Wally Grout just told him not to do it again. John Edrich (37) and Ken Barrington (38) also hit sixes and Mike Smith saw out the last half-hour as England made 186/3 to ensure a draw.

Result
Thanks to nine hours of rain Australia and England drew the Test to go into the Second Test with the series tied 0–0, though the hosts felt that they had the moral advantage.

Second Test – Melbourne

England's reply began with an 'electrifying' 88 in an hour by Boycott and Barber – what a pity that circumstances prevented this glamorous partnership from regularly plaguing England's opponents once this tour was over! From this beginning all those following took profit, so that England, for the first time in Australia since the Bodyline tour thirty-odd years before, topped 500.
E.W. Swanton

Preliminaries
The Australian captain Bobby Simpson and England vice-captain Colin Cowdrey were fit again and rejoined their respective teams. Ian Redpath was dropped due to his captain's return, as were Neil Hawke in favour of the fast bowler Garth McKenzie and Peter Allan for the fast-medium bowler Alan Connolly. The batsman Eric Russell and fast bowler Dave Brown were suffering from injuries and Ken Higgs had a chill. The Welsh left-arm fast bowler Jeff Jones was called up, as was the Essex all rounder Barry Knight flown out as a replacement just before the First Test. Simpson won the toss and batted on a good wicket.

Australia – First Innings
Bobby Simpson (59), Bill Lawry (88 in almost four and a half hours) and Bob Cowper (99) reached 278/4 by the end of the first day despite the best efforts of Jeff Jones (3/92). The next morning they collapsed to 358 all out with Barry Knight (4/84) taking four of the last five wickets and Tom Veivers being run out.

England – First Innings
Bob Barber (48) was determined to attack the Australian bowling from the get go, but was outpaced by Geoff Boycott (51) as they made 88 in an hour and 98 for the first wicket. John Edrich (109), Ken Barrington (64), Colin Cowdrey (104), Mike Smith (41), Jim Parks (71) and Fred Titmus (56 not out) piled up 558 as England made their biggest total down under since their 636 in the Second Test in 1928–29. Titmus was hit on the back of the head by a bouncer from Alan Connolly, but continued to play and hit three quick boundaries. They batted the into the fourth day and the long suffering Garth McKenzie took 5/134 off 35.2 eight-ball overs, which if nothing else confirmed his reputation of taking wickets on good batting tracks.

Australia – Second innings
Bobby Simpson (67) and Bill Lawry (78) added 120 for the first wicket and helped by poor light ending play two hours early Australia were 131/1 going into the last day. They had reached 204/4 when Jim Parks missed a stumping chance off Peter Burge when Australia were only four runs ahead. Burge made 120, his fourth and final Test century, all made against England in times of crisis, and Doug Walters 115 in his second Test. Mike Smith had given up hope when the part-time bowler Geoff Boycott (2/32) had Burge out after a stand of 198 and with Ken Barrington (2/47) surprisingly cleared up the tail to have Australia out for 426.

England – Second Innings
England needed to make 227 runs in less than half an hour and the match was called off after Boycott had made 5 not out.

Result
Thanks to some poor weather and some resolute Australian batting on the last day the Test was a draw, leaving the teams 0–0. Even though the first two Tests had been drawn the press were optimistic about the series. Lindsay Hassett said it wasn't the best team England had sent to Australia, but no other tried so hard to make cricket interesting.

Third Test – Sydney

Often in bleak moments do I cast back to Bob Barber's 185 in front of 40,000 on that sunny Friday in January 66. He batted without chance for five hours, starting decorously enough and then hitting the ball progressively harder and with a superb disdain to every corner of the field. One recalls the exceptional vigour of his driving and how he brought his wrists into the cut, making room for the stroke. It made blissful watching to English eyes – to one pair in particular, for by a wonderful chance father Barber had flown in from home that very day.
E.W. Swanton

Preliminaries
The Australian captain Bobby Simpson was unable to play due to chickenpox and his vice-captain Brian Booth led the team again. Grahame Thomas was brought into the team to open with Bill Lawry, Alan Connolly was replaced by the fast bowler Neil Hawke and the off-spinner Tom Veivers by David Sincock, one of the very rare specialist bowlers of left-arm wrist-spin. This type of bowling is usually reserved for part-time bowlers, but though "Evil Dick" could turn the ball and produce reverse googlies he struggled to produce a consistent line and length. England kept their team from Melbourne, except that Dave Brown was fit again and replaced Barry Knight. On a wicket famous for taking spin the toss was vital. Mike Smith won it for the first time in the series and chose to bat.

England – First Innings
Bob Barber's father arrived that morning from England in time to see his son play the innings of his life. The attacking opener hit the Australian bowlers for 19 fours in his 185 in five hours. It was his only Test century, his highest First Class score and the 234 runs he added for the first wicket with Geoff Boycott – whose 84 gave him 1,000 Test runs – was the third highest opening partnership for England in Australia. He was out on 308/2, after which England collapsed to 328/5 in the last hour of the first day. John Edrich made a solid 103, but Colin Cowdrey, M.J.K. Smith, Dave Brown and Jim Parks were all caught by Wally Grout off Neil Hawke, whose 7/105 was his best bowling in Tests. Grout snapped up Fred Titmus off Doug Walters (1/38) to give him five catches and reduce England to 395/8, but Dave Allen made 50 not out adding 93 runs for the last two wickets with Edrich and Jeff Jones, whose 16 was his highest Test score as England made 488.

Australia – First Innings
Jim Parks equalled Wally Grout's five dismissals in an innings with three catches and two stumpings, starting with Bill Lawry off Jeff Jones (2/51) for a duck in the first over. Grahame Thomas (51) and Bob Cowper (60) added 81 for the second wicket until separated by Dave Brown (5/63) and Australia were 113/4 by stumps. Cowper and David Sincock (29) added 50 runs together, but the tail collapsed and Australia were out for 221, 267 runs behind England as Mike Smith enforced the follow on.

Australia – Second Innings
The wicket began to take ever increasing turn and wickets fell regularly to the England off-spinners Fred Titmus (4/40) and Dave Allen (4/47). Titmus took his 100th Test wicket and as he had passed 1,000 Test runs in the England innings completed the double of 1,000 Test runs and 100 Test wickets. Jim Parks failed to dismiss any batsmen, but the expert close fielders Mike Smith and Colin Cowdrey took five catches between them. Doug Walters top scored with 35 not out and David Sincock hit 5 fours in his 27 as Australia fell to 174 all out and an innings defeat on the fourth day. Smith tried to give Dave Allen the honour of leading the England team off the field, but he and the others insisted that their captain should enter the pavilion first. They were greeted by the Australian captain Brian Booth, who shook hands with all the England players with his typical good sportsmanship.

Result
England beat Australia by an innings and 93 runs to give them a 1–0 lead in the series. It was the first time that Australia had lost by an innings at home since the Second Test of the 1936–37 Ashes series when they lost by an innings and 22 runs. It was their biggest defeat at home since the Fourth Test of the 1911–12 Ashes series when they lost by an innings and 225 runs (though they had lost the First Test of the 1928–29 Ashes series by 675 runs).

Fourth Test – Adelaide

Simpson now announced that his target would be a run a minute, an ordinary rate maybe in days gone, but a breakneck almost in the sixties, what with slow over-rates and so much accent on defence. Yet Australia, give or take a few minutes, achieved it, their captain leading the way with the highest opening stand ever, in a partnership with Lawry, for Australia against England: 244. I never remember seeing better running between wickets than of these two – and found myself comparing them, in fact, with Hobbs and Sutcliffe. With the field constantly changing over as right- and left-hander alternated, England, in much heat, sweated and chased unavailingly.
E.W. Swanton

Preliminaries
After Australia's biggest defeat at home in 50 years the Australian press were in uproar and the selectors Ewart Macmillan, Jack Ryder and Don Bradman took drastic action, dropping the captain Brian Booth, batsman Bob Cowper and the bowlers Garth McKenzie, Peter Philpott and David Sincock. Booth received a letter from Bradman on behalf of the selectors explaining "Never before have I written to a player to express my regret at his omission from the Australian XI. In your case I am making an exception because I want you to know how much my colleagues and I disliked having to make this move. Captain one match and out of the side the next looks like ingratitude, but you understand the circumstances and will be the first to admit that your form has not been good." Booth had made only 84 runs (16.80) in the series and never played for Australia again. Cowper was blamed for slow scoring even though he had made 99 and 60 in the Second and Third Tests. Peter Allan of Queensland was brought back into the side after he had taken the third best bowling figures in Australia – 10/61 in the first innings against Victoria, but was injured and McKenzie was restored to the team. The off-spinner Tom Veivers and young batsmen Ian Chappell were called up and Keith Stackpole made his Test debut, so Australia went to Adelaide with only three specialist bowlers – McKenzie, Hawke and Veivers. England simply kept the same XI from Sydney, even though this meant that Geoff Boycott was their third place bowler after Jeff Jones and Dave Brown. Mike Smith won the toss and decided to bat.

England – First Innings
The Adelaide Oval was notoriously flat, but Garth McKenzie was an expert on getting batsmen out on dull wickets and used the humid atmosphere and fresh pitch to bowl Bob Barber for a duck and have John Edrich caught by the ever-reliable Simpson at slip. Ian Chappell took a superb catch off Neil Hawke to remove Geoff Boycott and England were 33/3. Ken Barrington (60) and Colin Cowdrey (38) began to rebuild the innings with a 72 run partnership, until Cowdrey heard a shout from the Australian wicketkeeper Wally Grout, thought he was being called and was run out. Debutant Keith Stackpole took a great catch off Jim Parks (49) to give McKenzie his third wicket, who then removed Dave Allen and Dave Brown to give him his second five wicket haul in successive Tests. England were 240/9 at the end of the first day, which soon became 241 all out as McKenzie caught Fred Titmus (33) leg before wicket first thing in the morning to give him 6/48, his best Test bowling figures to date.

Australia – First Innings
With eight recognised batsmen Australia could expect a large total even though Simpson insisted that they make their runs quickly and by the end of the second day they were 333/3 with the captain 159 not out. Even Bill Lawry responded with 9 fours and a six in his 119 as he and Simpson put on 244 runs in 255 minutes for the first wicket, more than the entire England first innings. This remained the highest opening partnership for Australia against England until Mark Taylor and Geoff Marsh made 329 for the first wicket in the Fifth Test of the 1989 Ashes series and remains Australia's highest opening stand against England at home. Grahame Thomas made 52 of the 87 runs he added with Simpson as Australia passed 300 for the loss of one wicket. Jeff Jones (6/118) put up a fight, dismissing Thomas, Tom Veivers, Peter Burge, Ian Chappell, Simpson and Keith Stackpole, who made 43 batting at number eight. Simpson was finally out after batting for 545 minutes, hitting 18 fours and a six in his 225 as Australia made 516 to give them a lead of 275 runs.

England – Second Innings
Coming in to bat late on the third day England could only hope for a draw, but Neil Hawke (5/54) gave them a worst start than in the first innings as they collapsed to 32/3. Once again Ken Barrington and Colin Cowdrey had to rescue their side, Barrington staying in for six hours making 102 while Cowdrey took two and a half hours over his 35 as they added 82 for the fourth wicket. The Adelaide Oval was Barrington's favourite venue and his century kept up his record of never scoring less than 50 runs there; 104, 52, 52 not out, 63, 132 not out, 69, 51, 63, 60 and 102, a total of 748 runs (93.50). Keith Stackpole removed Cowdrey and Mike Smith with his leg-spin, his 2/33 remaining the best bowling figures of his Test career. Fred Titmus (53) hit 8 fours and added 81 for the seventh wicket with the entrenched Barrington, but England did not outlast the fourth day and were dismissed for 266.

Result
Australia beat England by an innings and 9 runs to even the series 1–1. It was only the third occasion that two teams had defeated each other by an innings in successive Tests. The previous two instances were when England won their biggest victory over Australia in the Fifth test at the Oval in 1938 by an innings and 579 runs only to suffer their greatest defeat in the First Test in Brisbane in 1946–47 by an innings and 332 runs (the Second World War intervening). In 1952–53 Pakistan lost their inaugural Test against India at New Delhi by an innings and 70 runs, but won the Second Test at Lucknow by an innings and 43 runs.

Fifth Test – Melbourne

When Australia batted, Lawry, their stumbling-block-extraordinary, took root, and in an interminable left-handed stand with Cowper effectively doused English prospects. When this relentless fellow, having reached his sixth Test hundred against England, at length took a liberty he had made 592 runs in the Tests, average 84, the highest aggregate since Bradman's in 1946/7: not only that, he had scored 979 against Smith's side since they landed in Perth, and had occupied the crease for forty-one and a half hours. There was a gayer side to Lawry as we had seen at Adelaide – but he didn't let it obtrude too often. He just kept that long, sharp nose religiously over the ball, accumulating at his own deliberate gait...
E.W. Swanton

Preliminaries
Each team made one change from the Fourth Test at Adelaide. England replaced the off-spinner Dave Allen with the all-rounder Barry Knight and Australia made Peter Burge twelfth man after he declared that he would not tour South Africa, allowing Bob Cowper to return to the team. Therefore, England only had four and Australia three specialist bowlers in the deciding Test of the series. Mike Smith won the toss for the third time in a row and again decided to bat.

England – First Innings
Needing quick runs to force a win England made 312/5 on the first day, but Geoff Boycott hogged the batting, ran out his opening partner Bob Barber and took 75 minutes to make 17 runs. However, the obstinate stonewaller Ken Barrington surprised the crowd by hitting 2 sixes and 8 fours in his 115, one of his few sustained hitting displays. He made 63 off 101 balls then hit Keith Stackpole over long on for six and brought up his century 20 balls later with a six into the South Stand off Tom Veivers. His hundred came off 122 balls and won him "one of the most moving ovations I have heard in Australia", and the Walter Lawrence Trophy for the fastest Test century of 1966. He was caught for 115 by Wally Grout who told Doug Walters to bowl him a ball down the leg so that he could move over and catch the glance. Garth McKenzie (1/100) and Neil Hawke (1/109) suffered, but Doug Walters took 4/53 to dismiss Barrington, John Edrich (85), Colin Cowdrey (79) and Mike Smith (0). Jim Parks (89) and Fred Titmus (42) added some late runs before Mike Smith declared on 485/9 an hour before stumps on the second day.

Australia – First Innings
Bobby Simpson and Grahame Thomas were soon out to leave Australia 36/2, but Bill Lawry and Bob Cowper saw out the day and batted through most of the next. Their carefully complied third wicket stand of 212 avoided the follow-on and England's best chance of regaining the Ashes, but failed to entertain the crowd. Lawry made a typical 108 in 369 minutes, but Cowper was 159 not out at the end of the third day and Australia 333/3. The fourth day was washed out, rendering the final day of the series academic as a result could not be forced on the flat wicket. Cowper, however, took his score to 307, the first Test triple century to be made in Australia and at 727 minutes the longest. It was his highest Test and First Class score and remains the highest and longest Ashes century down under though Matthew Hayden's 380 against Zimbabwe in 2002–03 is now the highest Test century. In the end he was bowled by Barry Knight (2/105) on 543/8 and Simpson declared to leave England just over an hour to bat.

England – Second Innings
Garth McKenzie made the most of the situation, taking 3/17 to dismiss Geoff Boycott, Bob Barber and John Edrich with England finishing with 69/3.

Result
Australia and England drew the Test and series 1–1, with Australia retaining the Ashes for the fourth time after regaining them in 1958–59. It was the second time the two teams had drawn the series in the last three Ashes series, with 15 of the 20 Tests being drawn (the next series was also drawn 1–1). It had already been realised that the captains on both sides were unusually cautious when playing each other as so much was at stake even though Bobby Simpson and Mike Smith had done all that they could to make the games interesting.

1965–66 Test Series Averages
Eleven batsmen averaged over 40 in the series, the most in an Ashes series in Australia since the timeless Tests of 1928–29 when twelve batsmen achieved this feat. It has not been equalled since, though ten batsmen averaged over 40 in 2002–03. Bill Lawry's 592 runs (84.57) was the most in an Ashes series since Don Bradman's 680 runs (97.14) in 1946–47 and his three centuries were the most since Arthur Morris three in 1948.
source

References

Bibliography
 Peter Arnold, The Illustrated Encyclopedia of World Cricket, W. H. Smith, 1985
 Mark Peel, England Expects, A biography of Ken Barrington, The Kingswood Press, 1992
 Ray Robinson, On Top Down Under, Cassell, 1975
 Ray Robinson and Mike Coward, England vs Australia 1932–1985, E.W. Swanton (ed), Barclays World of Cricket, Collins Willow, 1986
 E.W. Swanton, Swanton in Australia with MCC 1946–1975, Fontana/Collins, 1975
 E.W. Swanton (ed), Barclay's World of Cricket, Willow, 1986
 Fred Titmus, My Life in Cricket, Blake Publishing, 2005

Further reading
 A.B.C. Book 1965–66: M.C.C. Tour of Australia
 John Arlott, John Arlott's 100 Greatest Batsmen, MacDonald Queen Anne Press, 1986
 Bill Frindall, The Wisden Book of Test Cricket 1877–1978, Wisden, 1979
 Chris Harte, A History of Australian Cricket, Andre Deutsch, 1993
 Ashley Mallett, One of a Kind: The Doug Walters Story, Orion, 2009
 Rothmans, Rothmans Test Cricket Almanack: 1965–66 Series, Rothamns, 1965
 Huw Turbervill, The Toughest Tour: The Ashes Away Series: 1946 to 2007, Aurum Press Ltd, 2010
 Derek A. Watts, Young Jim: The Jim Parks Story (100 Greats Series), The History Press Ltd, 2005

Ashes series
Ashes series
Ashes series
Ashes series
Australian cricket seasons from 1945–46 to 1969–70
International cricket competitions from 1945–46 to 1960
The Ashes